András Merész (born 11 April 1963) is a Hungarian water polo coach. He was the head coach of the Hungary women's national water polo team at the 2012 Summer Olympics.

References

External links
 

1963 births
Living people
Hungarian male water polo players
Hungarian water polo coaches
Hungary women's national water polo team coaches
Water polo coaches at the 2012 Summer Olympics